Women's Open may refer to a number of sporting events:

Golf
U.S. Women's Open, an LPGA major championship
Women's British Open, an LPGA and Ladies European Tour major championship